Bucephalandra sordidula is a species of flowering plant in the family Araceae, native to Kalimantan on Borneo. It is capable of flowering underwater.

References

Aroideae
Endemic flora of Borneo
Plants described in 2014